Franz-Josef Spieker (24 November 1933, Paderborn – 18 March 1978, near Bali) was a German film maker.

Spieker studied theater and literary sciences at the DIFF (German Institute for Film and Television) in Munich. He worked as a photojournalist and film critic and later became an assistant director of Géza von Radványi in 1957, Stanley Kubrick (Paths of Glory) and Douglas Sirk, as a production and editing assistant.

In 1958, he shot his first short film, and in 1962, he signed the Oberhausen Manifesto. In the same year, he participated in the anthology film  (Look After Your Daughters), a predecessor to the sex report film, with the producer Walter Koppel wanting to win over the signatories of the Manifesto.

Spieker became famous in 1967 with his first full-length feature film , a satire on stubbornness, which made him a hope-bearer of New German Cinema. The satire on Bundeswehr,  and the social satire , while still acclaimed, but was not as popular as Wilder Reiter GmbH.

Spieker still made numerous short films and received the silver Deutscher Filmpreis in 1977 for Persönlichkeitstest on behalf of his production company, Cinema 80. He was found dead on the beaches of Bali. As a signatory of the Oberhausen Manifesto, he was posthumously honored with the gold Deutscher Filmpreis in 1982.

Filmography 
Feature films
 1964:  (anthology film)
 1967: 
 1968: 
 1969: 
 1970: Drücker (TV film) 
Short films
 1958: Menschen bei 30 Grad (documentary)
 1958: El Salvador (documentary)
 1958: Insel in der Sonne (documentary)
 1959: Masken und Gesichter
 1960: Alltag der 7. Muse
 1961: Süden im Schatten
 1963: Doppelkonzert
 1964: Das Malschiff
 1965: Salzburg Sight and Sound (documentary)
 1972: Das Jodelsystem
 1972: Abstraktes Echo
 1973: Spuren und Kontakte (documentary)
 1974: Pashupatinath Abendraga
 1975: Straßenartisten
 1977: Der Persönlichkeitstest
 1978: Nirmala (unfinished)

External links 
 
 Franz-Josef Spieker on the website that commemorated 30 years of the Oberhausen Manifesto

1933 births
1978 deaths
Film directors from North Rhine-Westphalia
People from Paderborn